The Tyrrell 024 was the car with which the Tyrrell team competed in the  Formula One season.  It was driven by Ukyo Katayama and Mika Salo, who were in their fourth and second seasons with the team respectively.

The car was a significant improvement over the ineffective  model, prompting Salo to say that they shouldn't be talked about in the same day.

Salo was generally impressive throughout the season, scoring vital points finishes on three occasions.  He again overshadowed Katayama, who moved to Minardi for 1997.

The team eventually finished eighth in the Constructors' Championship, with five points.

Complete Formula One results
(key) (results in bold indicate pole position)

References

Tyrrell Formula One cars
1996 Formula One season cars